The Bishop of Ferns and Leighlin was the Ordinary of  Church of Ireland diocese of Ferns and Leighlin in the Province of Dublin. The diocese comprised all of counties Wexford and Carlow and part of counties Wicklow and Laois in Republic of Ireland.

The Episcopal see was a union of the bishoprics of Ferns and Leighlin which were united in 1597. Over two hundred and thirty-eight years, there were twenty-nine bishops of the united diocese. Under the Church Temporalities (Ireland) Act 1833, Ferns and Leighlin were combined with Ossory to form the united bishopric of Ossory, Ferns and Leighlin on 12 July 1835.

List of Bishops of Ferns and Leighlin

See also

 Bishop of Ferns
 Bishop of Leighlin

References

Ferns and Leighlin
Ferns and Leighlin
Religion in County Wexford
Bishops of Ferns and Leighlin